Gregory John Hartmayer, O.F.M. Conv. (born ) is an American prelate of the Roman Catholic Church. A Conventual Franciscan, he serves as the archbishop of Atlanta in Georgia, having returned to the archdiocese where he worked from 1995 to 2011. From 2011 to 2020, Hartmayer served as the bishop of the Diocese of Savannah in Georgia.

Biography

Early life
Gregory Hartmayer was born on November 21, 1951, in Buffalo, New York, one of four children of John and Sally Hartmayer. He was raised in Tonawanda, New York, receiving his early education at St. Amelia School. Hartmayer graduated from Cardinal O'Hara High School in Tonawanda in 1969.

After graduating from high school, Hartmayer joined the Order of Friars Minor Conventual, commonly known as the Conventual Franciscans, at the St. Joseph Cupertino Friary in Ellicott City, Maryland.  He took his simple vows as a Conventual Franciscan friar on August 15, 1970, before making his solemn profession on August 15, 1973. Hartmayer also studied at St. Hyacinth College and Seminary in Granby, Massachusetts, where he obtained a Bachelor of Philosophy degree in 1974.

From 1974 to 1975, Hartmeyer taught at Archbishop Curley High School in Baltimore. He then returned to New York to study at St. Anthony-on-Hudson Seminary in Rensselaer, New York, receiving a Master of Theology degree in 1979.

Ordination and ministry
Hartmayer was ordained to the priesthood for the Conventual Franciscans by Bishop Howard J. Hubbard on May 5, 1979. He then returned to Archbishop Curley High School, where he served as a guidance counselor and teacher (1979-1985) and principal (1985-1988). In 1980, Hartmayer earned a Master of Arts degree in pastoral counseling from Emmanuel College in Boston. He served as principal of  Cardinal O'Hara High School from 1988 to 1989, when he became principal of St. Francis High School in Athol Springs, New York. Hartmayer received a Master of Education degree in secondary Catholic school administration from Boston College in 1992.

Following a three-month sabbatical at St. Patrick Seminary in Menlo Park, California, Hartmayer briefly served as an instructor at John Carroll Catholic High School in Fort Pierce, Florida, in 1995. In August of that year, he was named pastor of St. Philip Benizi Parish in Jonesboro, Georgia. He became pastor of St. John Vianney Parish in Lithia Springs, Georgia, in July 2010.

Bishop of Savannah

On July 19, 2011, Pope Benedict XVI appointed Hartmayer bishop of the Diocese of Savannah. His episcopal consecration took place on October 18, 2011, at the Cathedral of St. John the Baptist in Savannah, Georgia.   His principal consecrator was Archbishop Wilton Gregory, with Bishops J. Kevin Boland and Luis Zarama as co-consecrators.

The diocese reached a settlement in 2016 of $4.5 million to a man who accused  Wayland Brown, a diocese priest, of sexually abusing him in the 1980's.  Authorities could not criminally charge Brown with this offense due to the statute of limitations.  Already defrocked, Brown was sentenced to 20 years in prison in 2018 on other sexual abuse charges.

On November 12, 2018, Hartmayer released a list of 16 clergy from the diocese with credible accusations of sexual abuse of minors.  When Georgia Attorney General Chris Carr announced an investigation in May 2019 into sexual abuse claims against Catholic clergy in Georgia, Hartmayer pledged the full support of the Diocese of Savannah.

Hartmayer was appointed to the board of directors of the National Catholic Educational Association in 2019.

Archbishop of Atlanta
Pope Francis appointed Hartmayer as archbishop of the Archdiocese of Atlanta on March 5, 2020. He was installed on May 6, 2020 in the Cathedral of Christ the King in Atlanta. The ceremony was held behind closed doors, with only a few attendees due to the COVID-19 pandemic. Church journalist Rocco Palmo stated that Hartmayer was Archbishop Gregory's "chosen successor."

On November 26, 2021, Hartmeyer commented on the conviction of three while men in the murder of Ahmaud Arbery, a black man in Glynn County, Georgia:“We are called to acknowledge and root out racism in our neighborhoods, schools, workplaces and yes, even our churches. I hope you will join me in prayer, peace and restorative works of justice in this cause of respecting the human dignity of all.”

See also

 Catholic Church hierarchy
 Catholic Church in the United States
 Historical list of the Catholic bishops of the United States
 List of Catholic bishops of the United States
 Lists of patriarchs, archbishops, and bishops

References

External links
 Catholic Hierarchy Biography

1951 births
Boston College alumni
Living people
Religious leaders from Buffalo, New York
Roman Catholic bishops of Savannah, Georgia
Roman Catholic archbishops of Atlanta
Conventual Franciscan bishops
People from Tonawanda, New York
Catholics from New York (state)
21st-century Roman Catholic archbishops in the United States